Teens' love, also known as TL, is a genre of erotica fiction in Japan created by and marketed towards women. Teens' love is present in a variety of media, including anime, manga, and light novels. Teens' love content has a core demographic of women in their older teens to adults.

Themes
Teens' love is characterized by a romance depicting love and sex as synonymous. The story usually focuses on a female protagonist. Teens' love content is also marketed towards a younger audience. In 2007, several manga magazines with teens' love content were declared "harmful to youth" by the Osaka Prefectural Government and were restricted from being sold to people under 18 years old.

Chronology 
Manga magazines

 1998 L-Teen Comic First published.
 1998 Ren'ai Hakusho Pastel First published.
 2000 Zettai Ren'ai Sweet First published.
 2001 Ren'ai Sengen Pinkish First published.

 2004 Ren'ai Tengoku., Muteki Ren'ai S*girl. etc. First published
 2006 Ren'ai Cherry Pink First published.

 2008 mini Sherry First published.
 2009 mini Sugar First published.

Media

Currently publishing Media

Magazines currently publishing

Labels currently publishing 

† Has had some titles licensed in English.

‡ Has also published Yaoi and/or Hentai titles also.

Discontinued TL Manga Magazines 
 Daitosha/Shusuisha
miniSherry (2008-10)
Ren'ai Rakuen PURE (-2010)
miniLOVE 
 Kindai Eigasha
L Teen Comic (1998-2005)
 Heiwa Publishing
Ren'ai Sengen Pinkish (2001-05)
 Ohzora Publishing
Ren'ai Revolution
Ren'ai Kiss
Le Noel
Bunkasha Publishing
Kindan Lovers MAX

References

Anime and manga genres
Anime and manga terminology
Women in Japan
Erotic fiction